Cory Chettleburgh (born 21 August 1991 in New Zealand) is a New Zealand footballer who plays for Wairarapa United.

Career

England

Trailed with Ipswich Town in 2008 as a high schooler.

Netherlands

Landing a deal with Sparta Rotterdam of the Dutch Eerste Divisie in August 2010, Chettleburgh cut ties with De Kasteelheren that December, but still trained with them for some time after due to not finding a club before joining WHC Wezep in 2012.

Fiji

Cleared to don the Lautoka colours in 2018, the New Zealander contributed his first goal for the Blues in a 3-1 success over Madang at the 2018 OFC Champions League group stage.

Conduct 
Over the course of his career, he has committed a series misdemeanors during games, verbally abusing the assistant referee in 2010, and doing the same in 2016 twice, earning him seven-game and four-game suspensions.

Personal life
Owns a British passport through his English mother.

References

External links 

 at Soccerway Cory Chettleburgh @ Soccerway

1991 births
Living people
New Zealand association footballers
Expatriate footballers in the Netherlands
Lautoka F.C. players
Expatriate footballers in Fiji
Sparta Rotterdam players
WHC Wezep players
YoungHeart Manawatu players
Hawke's Bay United FC players
New Zealand expatriate association footballers
Team Wellington players
Eerste Divisie players
Tasman United players
Association football midfielders
New Zealand Football Championship players